Henderson Aviation Airport  is a public use airport located two nautical miles (4 km) northeast of the central business district of Felton, a town in Kent County, Delaware, United States. It is privately owned by Emad Albanna.

Facilities and aircraft 
It has one runway designated 15/33 with a turf surface measuring 2,048 by 40 feet (624 x 12 m). For the 12-month period ending May 21, 2002, the airport had 1,800 general aviation aircraft operations, an average of 150 per month.

References

External links 
 
Airports in Kent County, Delaware